Plamen Tsvetanov Getov (born 4 March 1959) is a Bulgarian retired footballer who played as either an attacking midfielder or a striker.

A skillful free-kick taker, he scored numerous goals from different positions, in a career which spanned almost 20 years. Getov represented Bulgaria at the 1986 World Cup.

Career
Born in Sungurlare, Getov grew up in Varna. A product of Spartak Varna's youth academy, he progressed to their first-team in the 1977–78 season. He made 37 league appearances with 7 goals in his tenure at the club and had a loan spell at Vatev Beloslav.

In June 1980, Getov joined Spartak Pleven, where he scored 123 goals in 207 matches for eight seasons. In 1984–85 season Getov became A Group top scorer with 26 goals.

He won the top Bulgarian league twice: with CSKA Sofia in 1989 and with Levski Sofia in 1993. Proclaimed the best player of the 1992–93 season, he added the league to the top scorer's crown, scoring 26 goals at 34 years of age – he had already won that award in 1985, with 26 for Pleven.

Getov retired with his first club at 39, amassing totals of 286 games and 165 goals in the country's top division, of which 108 were for Spartak Pleven.

International career
For the Bulgarian national team Getov gained 25 caps and netted four times, playing all four matches at the 1986 FIFA World Cup in Mexico and scoring against South Korea in a 1–1 group stage draw.

International goals

Honours

Club
CSKA Sofia
 A Group: 1988–89
 Bulgarian Cup: 1988-89
Levski Sofia
 A Group: 1992–93

Individual
 A Group Top Scorer (2): 1984–85 (26 goals); 1992–93 (26 goals)

References

External links

Levski official profile

1959 births
Living people
Sportspeople from Pleven
Bulgarian footballers
Association football midfielders
Association football forwards
First Professional Football League (Bulgaria) players
PFC Spartak Varna players
PFC Spartak Pleven players
FC Etar Veliko Tarnovo players
PFC Levski Sofia players
PFC CSKA Sofia players
PFC Cherno More Varna players
Primeira Liga players
Liga Portugal 2 players
Portimonense S.C. players
Bulgaria international footballers
1986 FIFA World Cup players
Bulgarian expatriate footballers
Expatriate footballers in Portugal
Bulgarian expatriate sportspeople in Portugal